, also known in the Kansai region as , is a leading Japanese national university located in the city of Kobe, in Hyōgo. It was established in 1949, but the academic origins of Kobe University trace back to the establishment of Kobe Higher Commercial School in 1902, which was renamed as Kobe University of Commerce, and Kobe University of Economics.  Kobe University is one of the oldest and largest national universities in Japan, as well as one of the highest ranking national universities in the country. It comprises 14 graduate schools and 11 undergraduate faculties, and holds about 16,000 students enrolled in undergraduate and graduate programs. The institution welcomes overseas students, which accounted for a total of 1,179 students, as of 1 May 2021.  It also has 3,102 staff members, including professors, associate professors and administrative officials.

Located beside the foothills of Mount Rokkō, the university provides a view of the city and port of Kobe, providing a privileged environment for the pursuit of academic studies, especially in social science areas.

Kobe Higher Commercial School was one of the oldest institution with business and economics majors in Japan. Especially, the Graduate School of Economics benefits fully from a century of the history and the tradition. Kobe is also the first collegiate business school in Japan. Therefore, Kobe is called the birthplace of Japanese higher education in economics and business administration, and it has always been the center of Japanese business studies.

Furthermore, the Graduate School of Law was also established with the legal studies section of the former Kobe University of Economics. It has become a leading institution of high academic institution in the field of legal and political studies, and has been successful in becoming a reputable academic center.

The Research Institute for Economics and Business Administration, founded in 1919, has a history as a high-level research institution for international economics and international management. The institute has been highly regarded internationally for its outstanding achievements in theoretical, historical, empirical, and quantitative research.

In the meantime, Kobe Hospital was established in 1869; it was a training center for medical practitioners, which was one of the oldest institutions in the modern medical education in Japan.

In 1990, they made new changes as one of the major universities specializing in graduate research and education.
Under the Japanese Ministry of Education and Science, it has started a new Center of Excellence (COE) projects, the "Research and Education Center of New Japanese Economic Paradigms", "Development and Education Center for Advanced Business Systems", and "Research Center for Dynamic Legal Processes of Advanced Market Societies".

History 

In 1929 this school was renamed , and it was further renamed in 1944, .

In 1949, under Japan's new educational systems, the university was merged with Hyogo Normal School, Hyogo Junior Normal School, Kobe Technical College and Himeji High School, all of which were in Hyōgo Prefecture, leading to the creation of Kobe University.

The university has since been expanded and has created new faculties to complement its main academic foundations, which have been strongly established in the fields of economics and commerce.

Graduate Schools 

 Graduate School of Humanities
 Graduate School of Intercultural Studies
 Graduate School of Human Development and Environment
 Graduate School of Law
Tier 1 full-time law school
 Graduate School of Economics
 The Okishio Theorem (Nobuo Okishio) is well known and appreciated worldwide
 Graduate School of Business Administration
Tier 1 full-time MBA school
 Graduate School of Science
 Graduate School of Medicine
 Graduate School of Health Sciences
 Graduate School of Engineering
 Graduate School of System Informatics
 Graduate School of Agricultural Science
 Graduate School of Maritime Sciences
 Graduate School of International Cooperation Studies

Faculties

Research Institutes 
 Research Institute for Economics and Business Administration

Campuses 

The university is formed by four campuses: Rokkodai, Kusunoki, Myodani, and Fukae. Rokkodai Campus is considered the main campus, and it comprises nine out of eleven faculties.

Rokkodai area 
 Campus
Law, Economics, Business Administration (2-1, Rokkodai, Nada-ku, Kobe)
 Campus
Letters, Science, Agriculture, Engineering  (1-1, Rokkodai, Nada-ku, Kobe)
 Campus
Intercultural Studies (1-2-1, Tsurukabuto, Nada-ku, Kobe)
 Campus
Human Development (3-11, Tsurukabuto, Nada-ku, Kobe)

Kusunoki area 
 Campus
Medicine (7-5-1, Kusunoki, Chūō-ku, Kobe)

Myodani area 
 Campus
Health Sciences (7-10-2, Tomogaoka, Suma-ku, Kobe)

Fukae area 
 Campus
Maritime Sciences (5-1-1, Fukaeminami, Higashinada-ku, Kobe)

Academic rankings 

Kobe University is one of the leading universities in Japan. It can be seen in the several rankings such as shown below.

General rankings 
The university is ranked 10th in 2010 in the ranking "Truly Strong Universities" by Toyo Keizai. In another ranking, Japanese prep school Kawaijuku ranked Shindai as the 11th best university in Japan.

In 2010 QS World University Rankings ranked Shindai 234th in the world. It is also ranked as the 26th best university in QS Asian University rankings.

Research performance 
Kobe University is one of the leading research institutions in Japan. According to Thomson Reuters, Shindai is the 14th best research university in Japan.

Weekly Diamond reported that Shindai has the 15th highest research standard in Japan in terms of research funding per researchers in COE Program. In the same article, it is also ranked 20th in terms of the quality of education by GP funds per student.

It especially has a high research standard in Social Science and Humanities.

Asahi Shimbun summarized the number of academic papers in Japanese major legal journals by university, and Shindai was ranked 5th during 2005–2009. Economics is also a notable field for Shindai. According to RePec, Shindai is the 7th best Economics research university in Jan 2011.

In addition, Nikkei Shimbun　on 2004/2/16 surveyed about the research standards in Engineering studies based on Thomson Reuters, Grants in Aid for Scientific Research and questionnaires to heads of 93 leading Japanese Research Centers, and Shindai was placed 12th (informative ability of research outcome 3rd) in this ranking.

Graduate school rankings 
Eduniversal ranked Shindai's MBA as 6th best in Japan in their MBA rankings. It also means 129th best in the world.

Shindai has one of the leading law schools in Japan as it was ranked 4th in 2009 (and 5th in 2011) in the passing rate of Japanese Bar Examination.

Alumni rankings 
Alumni of Shindai enjoy their good success in Japanese industries such as shown below.

According to the Weekly Economist's 2010 rankings, graduates from Shindai have the 18th best employment rate in 400 major companies in Japan. By contrast, the alumni of Shindai's average salary is very high with the 10th best in Japan, according to the PRESIDENT.

Mines ParisTech : Professional Ranking World Universities ranks Shindai as 25th in the world in 2011 in terms of the number of alumni listed among CEOs in the 500 largest worldwide companies. The university is also ranked 12th in Japan for the number of alumni holding the position of executive in the listed companies of Japan, and this number per student (probability of becoming an executive) is 21st.

Shindai graduates were ranked 8th in Japan in the number of successful national CPA exam applicants.

Popularity and selectivity 
Shindai is a popular university in Japan. Its entrance examination is usually considered as very selective. It is ranked in top 10 in Japan.

Scholarships for international students 
Kobe university encourages international students to study at the university through a number of scholarships for eligible  students. Some of them are:
Japanese Government Scholarship System
JASSO/ Honors Scholarship
Hyogo Prefecture Private Foreign Student Scholarship
Kobe/Sugawara Scholarship

Evaluation from Business World

Notable alumni 

Sōsuke Uno, 75th Prime Minister of Japan
Masayuki Naoshima, Minister of Economy, Trade and Industry (Japan)
Sanae Takaichi, Minister of State for Science and Technology Policy
Sazō Idemitsu, founder, Idemitsu Kosan Co.,Ltd.
Tadahiro Sekimoto, recipient of the IEEE Medal of Honor, ex-CEO, NEC Co., Ltd.
Shinya Yamanaka, stem cell researcher, awarded the Nobel Prize in Physiology or Medicine in 2012 
Shirin Nezammafi, Iranian writer
Shijaku Katsura II, Rakugo performer
Kuranosuke Sasaki, Japanese actor
Kumi Tanioka, Japanese video game music composer and musician
Yasuo Mizui, Sculptor, awarded Ordre des Arts et des Lettres (Commandeur)

Notable faculty 
Yasutomi Nishizuka, biochemist

See also 
 :Category:Academic staff of Kobe University

References

External links 
 Kobe University website(English)
 Kobe University/ Virtual Tour of Kobe University - Ocean Breeze from Kobe (movie)
 Kobe University (movie)
 Research Institute for Economics & Business Administration
 Graduate School of International Coopetation Studies
 Great Hanshin-Awaji Earthquake Disaster Materials Collection,Digital Archive (EDMC)
 Kobe University International Student Center
 EU Institute in Japan

Kansai Six (original)
Japanese national universities
Education in Kobe
Kobe University
Buildings and structures in Kobe
Kansai Collegiate American Football League
Art Deco architecture in Japan